Kamano may refer to:

Places
Kamano Island, Canada
Kamano No. 1 Rural LLG, Papua New Guinea
Kamano No. 2 Rural LLG, Papua New Guinea

Languages
Kamano language of Papua New Guinea

People
François Kamano
Stacy Kamano